Jaime R. Williams (born August 24, 1979) is the Assembly member for the 59th district of the New York State Assembly. She is a Democrat. The district includes portions of Canarsie, Georgetown, Mill Basin, Marine Park and Gerritsen Beach in Brooklyn.

Life and career
Williams was born and raised in Trinidad and Tobago before immigrating to New York City in 1999, where she has been a resident of Brooklyn ever since. Williams graduated from Fordham University with a master's degree in social work before going to work in the community, including for domestic violence prevention.

Following Hurricane Sandy, Williams worked for Catholic Social Services of Brooklyn and Queens to help with relief efforts.  She joined the staff of Assemblywoman Roxanne Persaud following her election in 2014 as her Chief of Staff.

New York Assembly
Assemblywoman Roxanne Persaud was elected to the New York Senate in a special election in November 2015 following John Sampson losing his Senate seat due to a felony conviction. As a result, she resigned from the Assembly to take her seat in the Senate.  Brooklyn Democrats soon after chose Williams to run in the special election to serve out the remainder of Persaud's term.  She went on to win the special election against Republican Jeffrey Feretti with 82.47% of the vote.

Williams was seated in the Assembly on May 10, 2016.

References

External links
New York State Assemblywoman Jaime Williams official site

Living people
Democratic Party members of the New York State Assembly
Women state legislators in New York (state)
Politicians from Brooklyn
Fordham University alumni
21st-century American politicians
21st-century American women politicians
1979 births